Thomas Alexander Murphree (December 1, 1883 – September 5, 1945) was a United States district judge of the United States District Court for the Northern District of Alabama.

Education and career

Born in Blount County, Alabama, Murphree received a Bachelor of Science degree from the University of Alabama in 1910 and a Bachelor of Laws from the University of Alabama School of Law in 1911. He was in private practice in Birmingham, Alabama from 1911 to 1938.

Federal judicial service

On May 12, 1938, Murphree was nominated by President Franklin D. Roosevelt to a new seat on the United States District Court for the Northern District of Alabama created by 52 Stat. 120. He was confirmed by the United States Senate on May 17, 1938, and received his commission on May 31, 1938. Murphree served in that capacity until his death on September 5, 1945.

References

Sources
 

1883 births
1945 deaths
Judges of the United States District Court for the Northern District of Alabama
United States district court judges appointed by Franklin D. Roosevelt
20th-century American judges
University of Alabama School of Law alumni
University of Alabama alumni